The poets listed below were either citizens or residents of Australia or published the bulk of their poetry whilst living there.

A

B

C

D

E

F

G

H

I–J

K

L

M

N

O

P

Q–R

S

T

V

W

Y–Z

See also

Poetry
List of poets
List of English language poets
Australian literature
Poets Union

References

Poets
Australian